Per Eklund (born July 9, 1970) is a Swedish former professional ice hockey player.

Eklund began playing hockey in Sollentuna HC but moved to Väsby IK to play in a higher level. 

He played one game in Allsvenskan, where Väsby had been relegated to from Elitserien, during the 1987–88 season. After a few years unsuccessful attempts to reach Elitserien, Eklund moved to Huddinge IK in the same division after the 1991–92 season. The team managed to reach the last promotion playoff two seasons in a row, however did not manage to go all the way to Elitserien. 

He made his Elitserien debut in Djurgårdens IF during the 1994–95 season. Eklund managed to score 19 goals and 29 point and was awarded Rookie of the Year. His achievements in Elitserien drew attention from NHL, and he was drafted by Detroit Red Wings in 1995, 182nd overall. He played the following two seasons in Djurgården before moving to Detroit's AHL franchise Adirondack Red Wings in 1997. The team made it to the Calder Cup but lost all three games in the first round against Albany River Rats.

Eklund returned to Djurgården after just one season in North America. He became Swedish champion with Djurgården in 2000, before moving abroad again, this time to the German team Krefeld Pinguine. He was not able to help the team to make the playoffs, and he moved back to Sweden and Linköpings HC the following season. After a total of five seasons in Linköping he moved back for a final Elitserien season in Djurgården. His last professional team was German Straubing Tigers which he played for during the 2006–07 season. He started playing hockey at a lower level in his first club, Sollentuna. After the 2008–09 season, he ended his playing career and became general manager for the senior team.

Career statistics

Regular season and playoffs

International

References

External links
 

1970 births
Adirondack Red Wings players
Detroit Red Wings draft picks
Djurgårdens IF Hockey players
Huddinge IK players
Linköping HC players
Living people
Swedish ice hockey right wingers